SI2 may refer to:
 Silicon Integration Initiative
 Storm from the Shadows, the second book in David Weber's Saganami Island series. 
 SI2, a grade of diamond clarity
 Solar Impulse 2, 2nd generation solar powered plane